Lawless Range is a 1935 American Western film released by Republic Pictures, directed by Robert N. Bradbury and starring John Wayne. He appears as a "singing cowboy" in the film, with his singing voice dubbed by Glenn Strange, who later found lasting film fame himself as Frankenstein's Monster.

Cast

 John Wayne as John Middleton, aka John Allen
 Sheila Bromley as Ann Mason 
 Frank McGlynn Jr. as Frank Carter, a banker
 Jack Curtis as Marshal
 Wally Howe as Uncle Hank Mason
 Julia Griffith as Aunt Marie Mason
 Yakima Canutt as Joe Burns, chief henchman
 Earl Dwire as Emmett, a storekeeper
 Victor Adamson as Henchman (uncredited)
 Chuck Baldra as Henchman / Singer (uncredited)
 Charles Brinley as Rancher (uncredited)
 Bob Burns as Bert, a Storekeeper (uncredited)
 Fred Burns as Rancher (uncredited)
 Frank Ellis as Saloon Henchman (uncredited)
 Sam Flint as Sam Middleton (uncredited)
 Herman Hack as Robber (uncredited)
 Jack Hendricks as Gambler (uncredited)
 John Ince as Clem (uncredited)
 Jack Kirk as Burns' Henchman (uncredited)
 Bob Kortman as Tall Ranch Hand Clocking John (uncredited)
 George Ovey as Shorty, Ranch Hand Clocking John (uncredited)
 Tex Palmer as Deputy Tex (uncredited)
 Fred Parker as Townsman (uncredited)
 Pascale Perry as Henchman (uncredited)
 Charles Sargent as Outlaw / Singer (uncredited)
 James Sheridan as Townsman (uncredited
 Glenn Strange as Burns' Henchman (uncredited)
 Francis Walker as Cowhand (uncredited)
 Slim Whitaker as Burns' Henchman (uncredited)
 The Wranglers as Singing Cowhands (uncredited)

See also
 John Wayne filmography

External links

1935 films
1935 Western (genre) films
American Western (genre) films
American black-and-white films
1930s English-language films
Films directed by Robert N. Bradbury
Republic Pictures films
1930s American films